(The) Call of the Blood may refer to: 
 Call of the Blood (1948 film), a British-Italian drama film
 Call of the Blood (1929 film), a Czech-German silent film
 The Call of the Blood (1920 film), a French silent drama film
 The Call of the Blood (1934 film), a Mexican drama film
 The Call of the Blood (novel), a 1906 novel by Robert Hichens